Ricardo Williams (born 29 September 1976) is a retired Jamaican sprinter who competed primarily in the 200 metres. He represented his country at the 2000 Summer Olympics, as well as two World Championships, in 2001 and 2003.

Competition record

Personal bests
Outdoor
100 metres – 10.19 (+0.9 m/s) (Prague 2007)
200 metres – 20.33 (-0.9 m/s) (Yokohama 2000)
Indoor
60 metres – 6.68 (Norman 2006)

References

1976 births
Living people
Jamaican male sprinters
Athletes (track and field) at the 2000 Summer Olympics
Olympic athletes of Jamaica
Athletes (track and field) at the 2002 Commonwealth Games
Commonwealth Games competitors for Jamaica